Lockwisch is a village and a former municipality in the Nordwestmecklenburg district, in Mecklenburg-Vorpommern, Germany. Since January 2019, it is part of the municipality Schönberg.

References

Nordwestmecklenburg
Former municipalities in Mecklenburg-Western Pomerania